David Fox is an American lawyer with a specialty in public companies mergers and acquisitions. He was with Skadden, Arps, Slate, Meagher & Flom for over 20 years, where he was a partner and a member of the executive team before moving to Kirkland & Ellis in 2009.

Early life
Fox was born in New York City in 1958. His father was Seymour Fox, a rabbi and Jewish educator, and mother was Sarah Kaminker, a city planner.  His family immigrated to Jerusalem when he was nine years old.

Career
At 25, Fox returned to New York, where he began his career with Skadden. Some notable transactions led by Fox at Skadden include the $6.6 billion leveraged buyout of Toys "R" Us and the sale of Aztar Corporation to Columbia Sussex for $2.75 billion.

In 2009, Fox left Skadden for Kirkland & Ellis, where he developed their M&A practice. At the time of his departure, Fox was one of the highest-paid lawyers at Skadden and it marked the first time a partner had left the firm for a competitor. At Kirkland, he oversaw the New York office, was a member of the executive committee and developed the M&A practice, which rose from 90th to first in global M&A rankings and helped the firm become the highest-grossing law firm in the world.

Fox has also been active in the M&A ecosystem of Israel. Some of the Israeli deals he handled include the sale of Koor Industries’s stake in Makhteshim Agan to ChemChina for $2.4 billion and Teva Pharmaceuticals' acquisition of Cephalon for $6.8 billion.

In addition to practicing law, Fox serves on a number of boards and has taught at his alma mater, Hebrew University of Jerusalem.

In 2018, The Deal honored Fox with its first ever M&A Lifetime Achievement award. In 2020, he stepped down from the executive committee at Kirkland.

Personal life
Fox has two brothers, Israeli filmmaker Eytan Fox and MIT Linguistics professor Danny Fox.

References

Hebrew University of Jerusalem alumni
Living people
American lawyers
Year of birth missing (living people)
People associated with Kirkland & Ellis
Skadden, Arps, Slate, Meagher & Flom people